Brooke Irene Austin (born 12 February 1996) is an American former tennis player.

Austin has a career-high singles ranking by the WTA of 424, achieved on 26 August 2013. She also has a career-high WTA doubles ranking of 638, achieved on 27 May 2013. Austin has won one singles title and two doubles titles ITF Circuit.

She made her Grand Slam main-draw debut at the 2016 US Open in the doubles event, partnering Kourtney Keegan.

Austin graduated from the University of Florida where she won the NCAA Division I Women's Tennis Championship in 2019 with a degree in Sociology, and has since started working for a cyber security company.

External links
 
 

1996 births
Living people
American female tennis players
Tennis players from Indianapolis
Florida Gators women's tennis players